Willard Wheatley MBE (16 July 1915 – 22 January 1997) was a British Virgin Islands educator and politician who served two consecutive terms as the Chief Minister of the British Virgin Islands from 1971 to 1979. He was the second ever Chief Minister of the Territory, and the first ever minister of finance. He served as Chief Minister at the head of two different coalition governments: one as de facto leader of the United Party, and the other the VI Democratic Party.

At an event to commemorate what would have been the 100th birthday of Wheatley, then Premier Orlando Smith made a commitment to provide public funds to memorialise his achievements and for a book about his life to be published.

His grandson Natalio Wheatley became Premier of the British Virgin Islands in May 2022.

Electoral history

Political offices

References
British Virgin Islands at World Statesmen.org

Footnotes

1915 births
1997 deaths
British Virgin Islands politicians
Chief Ministers of the British Virgin Islands
Finance Ministers of the British Virgin Islands
Leaders of the Opposition (British Virgin Islands)
United Party (British Virgin Islands) politicians
VI Democratic Party politicians